Football at the 1958 Asian Games was held in Tokyo, Japan from 24 May to 1 June 1958.

Medalists

Squads

Results

Preliminary round

Group A

Group B

Group C

Group D

Knockout round

Quarterfinals

Semifinals

Bronze medal match

Gold medal match

Final standing

References

External links
 Jönsson, Mikael; Morrison, Neil. "Asian Games 1958 (Tokyo, Japan)". RSSSF.

 
1958 Asian Games events
1958
Asian Games
Asian Games
1958 Asian Games